St. Andrew's Cathedral is the Anglican cathedral of the Diocese of Caledonia. It is in Prince Rupert, British Columbia.

St. Andrew's Cathedral (more formally, The Cathedral Church of St. Andrew) began as a series of church services held by Bishop Frederick DuVernet in June 1906 in the mess tent of the Grand Trunk Pacific Railway engineers who had arrived in May of that same year.  The "congregation", chiefly men of the camp, were called to services by the banging of the cook's triangle.  For a time, services were then held in St. Andrew's church hall which was opened on Easter Day, March 3st, 1907.

Meanwhile, the church leadership was given first choice of lots in Prince Rupert prior to the general land auction in 1909, and the bluff overlooking the harbour was selected.  Plans were drawn up and the hall (which is now the middle third of the Cathedral) was completed in 1912 with financial help from the B.C. and Yukon Church Aid Society.  Services and Sunday School were moved in shortly thereafter.

The upper story of the Cathedral was completed by a local contractor in 1925 and the first service in this space was held April 19th of that year.  The Casavant pipe organ was purchased and installed the following year.

In September 1929, the National Commission of the General Synod of the Church of England in Canada raised the church to the status of a cathedral with the Very Rev'd J. B. Gibson as the first Rector and Dean.

The Rector (Priest-in-Charge) of St Andrew's Cathedral, Prince Rupert is often the Dean of the Diocese of Caledonia, the Synod office of which is housed in the Cathedral.  In the Cathedral's history, the Deans of the Diocese have been:
 1929 – 1945: James B. Gibson (1st Dean) Bishop of Caledonia, 1945 
 1946 – 1957: Basil S. Prockter
 1957 – 1959: Albert Edward Hendy
 1959 - 1963: G. T. Pattison, D.D.
 1963 - ?: E. G. Flagg, D. D.
 1971 - 1985: R. Gary Paterson
 1985 - 1993: M. J. Wimmer
 1994 - 1997: Glen R. Burgomaster
 August 1999 - June 2, 2002: Hugo Jackson
 January 4, 2002 – May 25, 2008: Rob Sweet 
 October 9, 2009 - June 11, 2011: James Barlow
 October, 2011 – 2017: Jason Haggstrom
 June 1st, 2018 - present: Stephen Paul Williams

References
 

St. Andrew's
20th-century Anglican church buildings in Canada
Prince Rupert, British Columbia
Anglican church buildings in British Columbia